Breakin' 2: Electric Boogaloo is a 1984 American dance musical film directed by Sam Firstenberg. It is a sequel to the 1984 breakdancing film Breakin'. Electric Boogaloo was released seven months after its predecessor by TriStar Pictures. In some international locations the film was released under the title Breakdance 2: Electric Boogaloo. Another sequel, Rappin' (also known as Breakdance 3) was made but had an unconnected plot and different lead characters – only Ice-T features in all three films.

Plot
The three main dancers from Breakin' – Kelly "Special K" Bennett (Lucinda Dickey), Orlando "Ozone" Barco (Adolfo Quinones), and Tony "Turbo" Ainley (Michael Chambers) – struggle to stop the demolition of a community recreation center by a developer who wants to build a shopping mall. Viktor Manoel, Ice-T, Lela Rochon and Martika also appear as dancers.

Cast
 Lucinda Dickey as Kelly "Special K" Bennett
 Adolfo "Shabba Doo" Quiñones as Orlando "Ozone" Barco
 Michael "Boogaloo Shrimp" Chambers as Tony "Turbo" Ainley
 Susie Bono as Rhonda
 Harry Caesar as Byron
 Sabrina Garcia as Lucia
 Peter MacLean as Mr. Douglas
 Ice-T as Rapper "Ice-T"
 Cooley Jackson/Jaxson as Featured Street Dancer TKO
 John LaMotta as a Policeman
 Steve "Sugarfoot" Notario as Strobe
 Tyler Birch

Critical reception
Like its predecessor, Breakin' 2: Electric Boogaloo received mostly negative reviews from critics. New York Press film critic Armond White considered it to be "superb" and Roger Ebert gave the film a three out of four star rating. As of December 2017, Rotten Tomatoes gave it a rating of 29% based on 7 reviews.

Box office
The film grossed $2,921,030 in its first 5 days starting December 21, 1984, playing at 717 theaters in the United States and Canada and went on to gross $15.1 million in the United States and Canada, less than half that of its predecessor.

Soundtrack
Like its predecessor, much of the film's soundtrack was provided by Ollie & Jerry, comprising the duo Ollie E. Brown and Jerry Knight.  The title track, "Electric Boogaloo", reached number 45 on the R&B charts.

 "Electric Boogaloo" – Ollie & Jerry
 "Radiotron" – Firefox
 "Din Daa Daa" – George Kranz
 "When I.C.U." – Ollie & Jerry
 "Gotta Have the Money" – Steve Donn
 "Believe in the Beat" – Carol Lynn Townes
 "Set it out" – Midway
 "I Don't Wanna Come Down" – Mark Scott
 "Stylin' Profilin'" – Firefox
 "Oye Mamacita" – Rags & Riches

Charts

Home video releases
On April 15, 2003, MGM Home Entertainment released Breakin' 2: Electric Boogaloo as a bare-bones DVD. On April 21, 2015, Shout! Factory released the film, along with Breakin''', as a double feature Blu-ray.

 Legacy 

The subtitle "Electric Boogaloo", originally a reference to a funk-oriented dance style of the same name, has entered the popular culture lexicon as a snowclone nickname to denote an archetypal sequel. The usual connotation is of either a ridiculous sequel title, or of the follow-up to an obscure or eclectic film (or other work). The band Five Iron Frenzy titled one of their albums Five Iron Frenzy 2: Electric Boogaloo. The band Minus the Bear features the song "Get Me Naked 2: Electric Boogaloo" on the album Highly Refined Pirates. An episode of the television show It's Always Sunny in Philadelphia was titled "Chardee MacDennis 2: Electric Boogaloo". Other news articles and media have used the Electric Boogaloo subtitle, and it has also become an Internet meme. A documentary about the Cannon Group was released in 2014 called Electric Boogaloo: The Wild, Untold Story of Cannon Films of which Breakin' and Breakin' 2: Electric Boogaloo'' were featured.

The term "boogaloo" on its own has become a slang term on the Internet beginning as early as 2012, coming to widespread attention in late 2019. Used by some far-right extremists to describe an uprising against the American government, the term originated from the idea that such a conflict would be, like the film, a "sequel" to the American Civil War; that is, "Civil War 2: Electric Boogaloo". Groups subscribing to this ideology are considered to be a part of the boogaloo movement, and their members are often called "boogaloo boys".

References

External links
 
 

1984 films
1980s musical drama films
1980s dance films
American dance films
American musical drama films
Golan-Globus films
1980s hip hop films
American independent films
American sequel films
Snowclones
1980s English-language films
Films directed by Sam Firstenberg
TriStar Pictures films
1984 drama films
Breakdancing films
1984 independent films
Films produced by Menahem Golan
Films produced by Yoram Globus
1980s American films
Internet memes
Film and television memes